Pither Kalan Is a village, Union Council, and administrative subdivision of Jhelum District (Urdu جہلم) in the Punjab Province of Pakistan. It is part of Pind Dadan Khan Tehsil.

References 

Villages in Union Council Golepur